Dalmary is a small hamlet in Stirling, Scotland, situated in the civil parish of Drymen.

Unlike other settlements in the Drymen civil parish, Dalmary has an FK postcode whereas Drymen has a G postcode. It is also in the catchment area for Gartmore Primary School, which is in the catchment area for McLaren High School, however Dalmary is in the catchment area for Balfron High School.

References

Hamlets in Stirling (council area)